More Tales of the Unexpected is a collection of nine short stories by Roald Dahl. It was published in 1980 by Penguin. Five of the stories were published in prior collections, while the other four had not been previously collected in book form.

Stories
The collection contains the following stories:
"Genesis and Catastrophe" (previously collected in Kiss Kiss)
"Georgy Porgy" (previously collected in Kiss Kiss)
"Mr. Botibol"
"Poison" (previously collected in Someone Like You)
"The Butler" (subsequently collected in The Great Automatic Grammatizator)
"The Hitch-Hiker" (previously collected in The Wonderful Story of Henry Sugar and Six More)
"The Sound Machine" (previously collected in Someone Like You)
"The Umbrella Man" (subsequently collected in The Great Automatic Grammatizator)
"Vengeance is Mine Inc."

Adaptations
Stories from this anthology were adapted to television in the Anglia Television series, Tales of the Unexpected (1979–1988).

References

Short story collections by Roald Dahl
1980 short story collections